Dentimargo alisae is a species of sea snail, a marine gastropod mollusc in the family Marginellidae, the margin snails.

Description

Distribution
This marine species was found on the Norfolk Ridge.

References

 Boyer F. (2001). Espèces nouvelles de Marginellidae du niveau bathyal de la Nouvelle-Calédonie. Novapex 2(4): 157-169 

Marginellidae
Gastropods described in 2001